Elayiyeh (also Romanized as Elāyīyeh; also known as Elāhīyeh-e Şaḩneh) is a village in Hojr Rural District, in the Central District of Sahneh County, Kermanshah Province, Iran. At the 2006 census, its population was 1,388, in 357 families.

References 

Populated places in Sahneh County